Things named after the 19th-century French mathematician Augustin-Louis Cauchy include:

 Binet–Cauchy identity
 Bolzano–Cauchy theorem
 Cauchy's argument principle
 Cauchy–Binet formula
 Cauchy–Born rule
 Cauchy boundary condition
 Cauchy bounds
 Cauchy completeness
 Cauchy completion
 Cauchy condensation test
 Cauchy-continuous function
 Cauchy's convergence test
 Cauchy (crater)
 Cauchy–Davenport theorem
 Cauchy determinant
 Cauchy distribution
Log-Cauchy distribution
Wrapped Cauchy distribution
 Cauchy elastic material
 Cauchy's equation
 Cauchy–Euler equation
 Cauchy's functional equation
 Cauchy filter
 Cauchy formula for repeated integration
 Cauchy–Frobenius lemma
 Cauchy–Green deformation tensor
 Cauchy–Hadamard theorem
 Cauchy horizon
 Cauchy identity
 Cauchy index
 Cauchy inequality
 Cauchy's integral formula
 Cauchy's integral theorem
 Cauchy interlacing theorem
 Cauchy–Kovalevskaya theorem
 Cauchy–Kowalevski theorem
 Cauchy–Lipschitz theorem
 Cauchy matrix
 Cauchy momentum equation
 Cauchy net
 Cauchy number
 Cauchy–Peano theorem
 Cauchy point
 Cauchy principal value
 Cauchy problem
Abstract Cauchy problem
 Cauchy process
 Cauchy product
 Cauchy's radical test
 Cauchy–Rassias stability
 Cauchy ratio test
 Cauchy–Riemann equations
 Cauchy–Riemann manifold
 Cauchy's Residue Theorem
 Cauchy–Schlömilch transformation
 Cauchy–Schwarz inequality
 Cauchy sequence
Uniformly Cauchy sequence
 Cauchy space
 Cauchy surface
 Cauchy's mean value theorem
 Cauchy stress tensor
 Cauchy's theorem (geometry)
 Cauchy's theorem (group theory)
 Cauchy's two-line notation
 Euler–Cauchy stress principle
 Maclaurin–Cauchy test

Cauchy